The electoral district of Berwick is an electoral district of the Legislative Assembly in the Australian state of Victoria.

The original electoral district of Berwick was abolished in 2002. In the 2021 redistribution, it was revived as a new electoral district to be contested at the 2022 Victorian state election. It covers areas from the abolished district of Gembrook, and covers outer Eastern suburbs of Melbourne. It includes the suburbs of Beaconsfield, Berwick, Clyde North and small towns around Cardinia Creek south of Emerald.

The abolished seat of Gembrook was held by Liberal MP Brad Battin, who recontested Berwick and retained the seat at the 2022 election.

Members for Berwick

Election results

References

Electoral districts of Victoria (Australia)
1976 establishments in Australia
2002 disestablishments in Australia
2022 establishments in Australia
Shire of Cardinia
City of Casey
Electoral districts and divisions of Greater Melbourne